Vijaypur, officially known as Bijaypur is a hill station and village situated  in Bageshwar district in the state of Uttarakhand, India. It is located at a distance of 30 km from Bageshwar and 5 km from Kanda; amidst dense Pine Forests on the Bageshwar-Chaukori Highway.

It is situated at an altitude of 2050m, and is known for its panoramic views of snow-capped Himalayan peaks like Trisul, Nanda Devi and Nanda Kot. The Dhaulinag Temple, situated in vijaypur is among the 8 prominent Nag temples of Kumaun, the others being Berinag, Kalinag, Feninag, Karkotaknag, Pinglenag, Kharharinag and Athgulinag.

Places of interest

Dhaulinag temple
Dhaulinag temple is situated at the top of the Vijaypur Mountain. The temple is located at walking distance from Vijaypur, and is visited by devotees mainly during Navratri. Panchmi Mela is a very famous festival celebrated over here.

Tea gardens
The tea estate at Vijaypur was set up by the British in the twentieth Century. Much later, the estate was acquired by Vijay Lal Shah, a Gujarati trader, who self-importantly renamed the town after himself.

Transport
Vijaypur is located on the NH 309A at a distance of 30 km from Bageshwar and 5 km from Kanda. Share-Taxis are available from Vijaypur towards the nearby towns of Kanda, Kotmunya and Udiyari bend. Buses run by Uttarakhand Transport Corporation and K.M.O.U connect it to cities of Bageshwar, Almora, Berinag and Delhi. It lies on the route of Kailash Mansarovar.

Gallery

See also
 Kanda
 Bageshwar district
 Uttarakhand

References

Cities and towns in Bageshwar district
Hill stations in Uttarakhand
Tourism in Uttarakhand
Bageshwar district